The Canonets were a series of rangefinder cameras made by Canon from the early 1960s to the early 1980s. They were aimed at enthusiasts on a budget and more discerning point-and-shoot photographers.  These cameras are considered to have made Canon famous worldwide.

Models 
The models included

 Canon Canonet
 Canon Canonet S
 Canon Canonet Junior
 Canon Canonet Slim pick
 Canon Canonet QL 17
 Canon Canonet QL 17 New
 Canon Canonet QL 17-L New
 Canon Canonet QL 17 GIII
 Canon Canonet QL 19
 Canon Canonet QL 19E
 Canon Canonet QL 19 New
 Canon Canonet QL 19 GIII
 Canon Canonet QL 25
 Canon Canonet 28
 Canon Canonet 28 New
 Canon Canodate E
 Canon Canodate E-N
 Canon Datematic

See also 
Point-and-shoot camera

External links 

 Manual for the Canonet QL17III and the newer QL19
Infos about Canon Canonet 28 on camdex.fr
Infos about Canon GIII QL 17 on camdex.fr

Canon rangefinder cameras